Igmetovo (İğmät) is a rural locality (a selo) and the administrative centre of Igmetovsky Selsoviet, Ilishevsky District, Bashkortostan, Russia. The population was 296 as of 2010. There are 8 streets.

Geography 
Igmetovo is located 27 km southeast of Verkhneyarkeyevo (the district's administrative centre) by road. Abdullino is the nearest rural locality.

References 

Rural localities in Ilishevsky District